Laura Montalvo and Paola Suárez were the defending champions but only Montalvo competed that year with Henrieta Nagyová.

Montalvo and Nagyová won in the final 6–3, 6–1 against María José Gaidano and Marion Maruska.

Seeds
Champion seeds are indicated in bold text while text in italics indicates the round in which those seeds were eliminated.

 Amanda Coetzer /  Miriam Oremans (semifinals)
n/a
 Rachel McQuillan /  Corina Morariu (first round)
 Laura Garrone /  Virginia Ruano-Pascual (semifinals)

Draw

External links
 1997 Croatian Bol Ladies Open Doubles Draw

Croatian Bol Ladies Open
1997 WTA Tour